Evani is both a surname and a given name. Notable people with the name include:

Alberico Evani (born 1963), Italian footballer and manager
Evani Esperance (born 1990), Surinamese footballer

See also
Avani (given name)
Evans (surname)